Clubul Sportiv Armata Aurul Brad, commonly known as CSA Aurul Brad, or simply as Aurul Brad, is a Romanian amateur football club based in Brad, Hunedoara County, founded in 1934. The club is currently playing in the Liga IV.

History
Aurul Brad was founded in 1934, under the name of Mica Brad. Throughout its over 85 years of history, the club was also known as Metalul Brad or Progresul Brad.

In the 1940–41 season, Aurul Brad played in the Divizia A, the first tier of the Romanian football league system. This was a notable achievement for a small town like Brad and the team was also able to finish in 5th, out of 13. That was the last season before World War II. After WWII, Aurul never managed to play again in the first league, despite it was never relegated.

Ground
The team plays its home matches in Brad, Hunedoara County, on the Aurul Stadium, with a capacity of 1,500 seats.

Chronology of names

Honours
Liga II
Winners (1): 1939–40

Liga III
Winners (2): 1975–76, 1989–90

Liga IV – Hunedoara County
Winners (3): 1996–97, 1997–98, 2020–21
Runners-up (4) 1994–95, 2008–09, 2009–10, 2011–12

Hunedoara Regional Championship:
Winners (2): 1964–65, 1966–67
Runners-up (3) 1963–64, 1965–66, 1967–68

Cupa României – Hunedoara County
Winners (1): 2012–13
Runners-up (1): 2018–19

Other performances 
Appearances in Liga I: 1

Players

First-team squad

Out on loan

Club Officials

Board of directors

Current technical staff

League history

References

External links
 Hunedoreanul.gandul.info 
 Aurul Brad at liga2.prosport.ro
 Aurul Brad at romaniansoccer.ro

Football clubs in Hunedoara County
Association football clubs established in 1934
Liga I clubs
Liga II clubs
Liga III clubs
Liga IV clubs
1934 establishments in Romania
Brad, Hunedoara